Parco Sempione ("Simplon Park") is a large city park in the historic center of Milan, region of Lombardy, Italy.

The vaguely polygonal park is anchored to the southeast by grounds of the Sforza Castle and a linear axis leads in the northwest to the Arch of Peace. The perpendicular axis to these two landmarks is flanked on the northeast by the oval Arena Civica and in the southwest by the Palazzo dell'Arte ("Palace of Art"), built in 1933 to house the Fifth Triennale di Milano art and design exposition, and now a permanent museum, theater, and exhibition hall. Contemporary and near the Palazzo dell'Arte is the steel tower-spire Torre Branca, designed in 1933 by Gio Ponti as Tower Littoria (Lictor's Tower). Near the Arena, stands the public aquarium.

History
Prior to the Sempione Park, this site formed the Visconti ducal park or "Barcho". This oak and chestnur forest lands was enlarged and enclosed by the Sforza to encompass 3 million square meters in area. In addition to housing hunted game, exotic animals were also introduced by members of the house of Sforza.

By the 18th century, the land was in disuse, and in 1861 was partly used for agriculture. The current park land was used for martial exercises and parades for the troops barracked in the Sforza Castle. During the Napoleonic era the architect Giovanni Antonio Antolini proposed the construction of the Foro Buonaparte or Bonaparte Forum, a large building complex around the castle.  Never completed, and in its place the parade ground was transformed into a large lawn for civic use, adorned on the north-eastern side by the Arena, and on the north-western side by the Arch of Peace, point of beginning of the axis of the Sempione.

After the unification of Italy, the military use of the area ceased, and at the same time the city began to experience a demographic increase that required the construction of new neighborhoods. A real estate company proposed to redevelop the area of the castle (which was expected to be demolished) and the parade ground, similar to what was done in the area of the hospital, but the proposal caused strong protests from the citizenship of Milan. This led to the development of the committee established to draw up the first urban regulatory plan, developed up by the engineer Cesare Beruto (the Beruto Plan). This plan, which initially partially incorporated the building on the area, was modified several times to allocate the entire parade ground to a public garden. For the castle a restoration was planned, with the intention to create a destination for cultural uses.

The park, called "Parco Sempione", was built between 1888 and 1894 according to the project of architect Emilio Alemagna, which provided avenues for carriage, a pond and a belvedere where the Biblioteca del Parco Sempione currently stands. The green was designed according to the romantic model of the English parks.

Toponymy
It owes its name to Corso Sempione, a major thoroughfare of Milan, dating back to the Napoleonic Empire.

Monuments and Sculptures
The park has accumulated an eclectic set of public art-works, recently most were retained after their display in a Triennale:
Teatro Continuo (1973): a prominent sculpture by Alberto Burri, dismantled in 1989, but restored and repositioned in its original location on the occasion of Expo 2015.
Accumulazione Musicale e Seduta (or amphitheater) (1972): architectural monument designed by Arman 
Equestrian Monument to Napoleone III: bronze statue by the sculptor Francesco Barzaghi, completed by 1881, but deemed controversial and not installed until 1927 
I Bagni Misteriosi (Mysterious Baths) (1973): Multicolor whimsical fountain with sculptures designed by Giorgio de Chirico
Ponte delle Sirenette (Bridge of Mermaids): Pedestrian bridge designed by Francesco Tettamanzi and inaugurated in 1842 to span a canal (naviglio) located where now runs via Uberto Visconti di Modrone, and moved to the park in 1930.
Chiosco Scultura (1973): abstract sculptural monument by Giorgio Amelio Roccamonte 
Feroce Equilibrio (Fierce Equilibrium) (1973): Steel abstract sculpture by Carlo Mo
Public Library (1954): Display pavilion building from the X Triennial, converted to library.

Communications
The whole area of the park is covered by a free wireless network.

References

External links

 (in Italian)

Urban public parks
Parks in Milan
Tourist attractions in Milan
World's fair sites in Milan
1888 establishments in Italy